The John Bohrnstedt House is historic house located in Galesville, Wisconsin, USA.

John Bohrenstedt (1833–1909) was a German immigrant. He was a farmer and stakeholder in the Bank of Galesville.

It was added to the National Register of Historic Places on September 18, 1984.

References

Houses completed in 1901
Houses in Trempealeau County, Wisconsin
Houses on the National Register of Historic Places in Wisconsin
National Register of Historic Places in Trempealeau County, Wisconsin